José Audelio Ibáñez (born March 14, 1968) is a retired racing cyclist from Colombia, who was a professional from 1997 to 1998. Born in Tunja, Boyacá, he was nicknamed "El Barón Gallero" during his career, because he was born in a Tunja's vereda called "El Barón Gallero".

Career

1992
1st Stage 10 Vuelta a Colombia
2006
3rd overall, Vuelta a los Santanderes
1st Stage 5 Clásico RCN

References
 

1968 births
Living people
People from Tunja
Colombian male cyclists
Vuelta a Colombia stage winners
Sportspeople from Boyacá Department
20th-century Colombian people
21st-century Colombian people